Dowlatabad-e Qeysariyeh (also Romanized as Dowlatābād-e Qeyşarīyeh) is a village in Azimiyeh Rural District, in the Central District of Ray County, Tehran Province, Iran. At the 2006 census, its population was 920, in 230 families.

References 

Populated places in Ray County, Iran